LaRue Kirby (December 30, 1889 – June 10, 1961) was a baseball outfielder who made his professional debut in 1910 with the Class D Traverse City Resorters of the Michigan State League, and then would advance in 1912 to Major League Baseball where he played for the New York Giants and St. Louis Terriers.

He also pitched 18 innings in the major leagues, 11 innings for the New York Giants in 1912 and 7 innings for the St. Louis Terriers of the Federal League in 1915, going 1-0 with a 5.50 ERA.

References

External links

1889 births
1961 deaths
Major League Baseball outfielders
New York Giants (NL) players
St. Louis Terriers players
Baseball players from Michigan
Traverse City Resorters players
Pensacola Snappers players
Burials in Michigan
Bloomington Bloomers players
Enid Harvesters players
Little Rock Travelers players
Mobile Sea Gulls players
Muskegon Muskies players
Omaha Rourkes players
Rochester Hustlers players
Saginaw Aces players
Shamokin Indians players
St. Joseph Saints players
Terre Haute Tots players
Wilkes-Barre Barons (baseball) players